This page lists the winners and nominees for the Billboard Music Award for Top R&B Album. This category was one of the first created and has been given out since the award's conception in 1990. Only four artists have won this award twice: Beyoncé, Whitney Houston, Usher and The Weeknd.

Winners and nominees
Winners are listed first and highlighted in bold.

1990s

2000s

2010s

2020s

Multiple wins and nominations

Wins
2 wins
 Beyoncé
 Whitney Houston
 Usher
 The Weeknd

Nominations

6 nominations
 Chris Brown
 The Weeknd

5 nominations
 Beyoncé
 Rihanna

3 nominations
 Alicia Keys
 R. Kelly
 Khalid
 Usher

2 nominations
 Mary J. Blige
 DMX
 Doja Cat
 Lauryn Hill
 Whitney Houston
 Jay Z
 Bruno Mars
 Frank Ocean
 Justin Timberlake
 XXXTentacion

References

Billboard awards
Album awards